Sam Miller (born 28 September 1962) is an English television director and former actor. He has worked on the BBC television dramas Cardiac Arrest, This Life and Luther. He works with London-based production company Mustard Film Company. He is father of the actor William Miller, who played Oliver Twist in the 2007 television adaptation.

Miller has received three Emmy nominations for Outstanding Directing for a Miniseries, Movie or a Dramatic Special, one in 2012 for Luther and two in 2021 for I May Destroy You for the episodes "Eyes Eyes Eyes Eyes" and "Ego Death" (with Michaela Coel).

Filmography

As a director

As an actor
The Great Escape II: The Untold Story (1988) (TV) .... Air Reconnaissance Officer
Murder East - Murder West (1990) (TV) .... Christian
The Bill (TV) Sgt. John Maitland 1990-1993
Fergie & Andrew: Behind the Palace Doors (1992) (TV) .... Prince Andrew, Duke of York
Krakatoa: The Last Days (2006) - Narrator

As a producer
Elephant Juice (1999) (co-producer)
Fortitude (2015) (co-producer)
Guerrilla (2017) (associate producer)
Rellik (2017) (executive producer)

References

English television directors
People from Saxmundham
Living people
1962 births